The British Darts Organisation organised many darts tournaments each year including Major titles such as the Lakeside World Professional Championship and the Winmau World Masters until its demise in September 2020. The Tournaments listed below were recognised BDO ranking events for the BDO Invitational Table point allocation system  that determined players qualification for its Major tournament finals. The BDO's own tournaments are in bold.

Tournament levels and points allocation
The BDO Invitational Table relates only to registered playing members of the BDO, who comply with BDO and World Darts Federation (WDF) eligibility rules including terms and conditions of the 1997 Tomlin Order. The BDO awards points depending on player's performances within each of its events. Twenty-seven points are awarded to the champion of each its three Major Events – The Lakeside World Professional Championship, The Bavaria World Darts Trophy and the Winmau World Masters. Lower points are awarded for each round of the tournament reached. Other events are placed into Category A+, A, B, C and D based on the prize-pool and number of payouts, with points for placings slowly decreasing. Only the best 12 placings are added for the players ranking that define seedings and qualification for events it stages. The BDO Invitational rankings sees the points wiped after the seedings for the World Championship are decided from the following 94 tournaments:

The three BDO Major tournaments.
The six BDO Category A+ tournaments.
The ten BDO Category A tournaments.
The nine BDO Category B tournaments.
The fourteen BDO Category C tournaments.
The forty eight BDO Category D tournaments.
The four BDO Special Qualifiers tournaments.

Ranking method
Since the formation of the BDO rankings in 1974 the method used to calculate a player's ranking points has changed several times.

Current points distribution
Points are currently awarded as follows:

Current tournament categories

Majors

Category A+

Category A

Slovak Open

Category B

Category C

Category D

BDO Special Qualifiers

BDO other tournaments

Former ranked tournaments

References

External links
British Darts Organisation Invitational Tables System Men & Women.

Darts tournaments